Holy Mountain may refer to:
the mytheme or archetype of the world mountain
specific peaks identified as sacred mountains
in Abrahamic tradition
 Mount Sinai, by the Bedouin, a mountain in the Sinai Peninsula of Egypt
 Mount Tabor, Lower Galilee, Israel
 Temple Mount, Jerusalem

Toponymy 
 Mount Athos, called the Holy Mountain or Hagion Oros (Ἅγιον Ὄρος)
 The Holy Mountain, a translation of Jebel Barkal, a mountain in Nubia
 Sacri Monti of Piedmont and Lombardy (Italy), World Heritage Site

Popular culture 
 The Holy Mountain (1926 film), a German silent film
 The Holy Mountain (1973 film), a 1973 film directed by Alejandro Jodorowsky
 Holy Mountain (website), a National Film Board of Canada interactive documentary
 Holy Mountain (band), a Scottish psychedelic rock band
 Sleep's Holy Mountain, a 1993 album by the band Sleep
 "Holy Mountains", a song by the band System of a Down on the album Hypnotize
 Holy Mountain Records, a record label, distributing artists such as the band Om
 "Holy Mountain" (song), a song by Noel Gallagher's High Flying Birds from the album Who Built the Moon?
 "The Holy Mountain", a song by Poppy from the 2019 EP Choke